Pirdalu (also Romanized as Pīrdālū) is a village in Shahid Modarres Rural District, in the Central District of Shushtar County, Khuzestan Province, Iran. At the 2006 census, its population was 1,915, in 338 families.

References 

Populated places in Shushtar County